Elegy for a Lady is a one-act play by Arthur Miller.  It was first presented in 1982 by the Long Wharf Theatre in New Haven, Connecticut, where it was combined with Some Kind of Love Story under the title 2 by A.M.; the combination of these two plays has also been presented as Two-Way Mirror.

References

1982 plays
Plays by Arthur Miller
One-act plays